N·E·W·S is the twenty-seventh studio album by American recording artist Prince. It was released on May 26, 2003 by NPG Records. The album is the second instrumental album released under Prince's own name, containing four tracks of 14 minutes duration each. Recorded at Prince's Paisley Park Studios over a single day, the album was initially available through Prince's NPG Music Club website on May 26, 2003 before becoming widely commercially available on July 29. The album can be seen as a modern incarnation of Madhouse, but this time as a Prince release. Original Madhouse member Eric Leeds lends his talents, as well as The New Power Generation members John Blackwell, Rhonda Smith and Renato Neto. The album was recorded improvisationally.

The album is the lowest-selling Prince album released to date, with just 30,000 copies sold, but it did become a top ten hit on the Billboard Internet sales chart, and garnered a Grammy nomination for Best Pop Instrumental Album. The album artwork folded out into a ninja star. Produced by Prince, the album is credited as "Directed By Prince".

The track "West" was included on the 2018 compilation Anthology: 1995–2010.

Style and composition
The album is an all-instrumental album featuring styles of New Age, jazz-funk, and jazz fusion.

Reception

The album received mostly negative reviews from critics, with several critics noting the album's lack of cohesion.

In a 2 out of 5 star review, Allmusic reviewer William Ruhlman criticized the album as directionless, stating "The listener, who will have to be a particularly rabid aficionado of all things Prince to be interested, must throw out all expectations and simply revel in the joy of hearing the musician and his cohorts experiment with relaxed musical textures for 56 minutes. Of course, no one else needs to bother." In a positive review for Jazz Times Lucy Tauss summarized "exploratory and evocative, N.E.W.S. is an intriguing departure for this enigmatic and unpredictable artist."

The Guardian ranked the album last out of Prince's 37 studio albums. Stereogum ranked it 20th out of 30 main Prince albums released by 2014, stating "there's no pretending that this isn't for the diehards primarily, or that it's even a coherent collection, but it's great to see a man with so many ideas let some new ones loose." Metro Weekly ranked the album 2nd to last of all Prince albums in a 2014 feature, calling it "a 56-minute exercise in tedium".

Track listing

Personnel 
Band
 Prince – electric guitar, Fender Rhodes, digital keyboards and percussion, production, mixing, art design
 Eric Leeds – tenor and baritone saxophone
 John Blackwell – drums
 Renato Neto – piano and synthesizers
 Rhonda Smith – electric and acoustic bass

Design
Jeremy Gavin - Art design

Production
Jess Sutcliffe - Engineer
Joseph Lepinski - musical technician
Takumi - musical technician

Charts

References 

2003 albums
Prince (musician) albums
Albums produced by Prince (musician)
NPG Records albums
Instrumental albums
Concept albums
Albums arranged by Clare Fischer